Marcus Arrecinus Clemens may refer to: 

Marcus Arrecinus Clemens (praetorian prefect under Caligula)
Marcus Arrecinus Clemens (consul), son of the previous